Ulnar nerve entrapment is a condition where the ulnar nerve becomes physically trapped or pinched, resulting in pain, numbness, or weakness, primarily affecting the little finger and ring finger of the hand. Entrapment may occur at any point from the spine at cervical vertebra C7 to the wrist; the most common point of entrapment is in the elbow (Cubital tunnel syndrome). Prevention is mostly through correct posture and avoiding repetitive or constant strain (e.g. "cell phone elbow"). Treatment is usually conservative, including medication, activity modification, and exercise, but may sometimes include surgery. Prognosis is generally good, with mild to moderate symptoms often resolving spontaneously.

Signs and symptoms
In general, ulnar neuropathy will result in symptoms in a specific anatomic distribution, affecting the little finger, the ulnar half of the ring finger, and the intrinsic muscles of the hand.

The specific symptoms experienced in the characteristic distribution depend on the specific location of ulnar nerve impingement. Symptoms of ulnar neuropathy may be motor, sensory, or both depending on the location of injury. Motor symptoms consistent of muscle weakness; sensory symptoms or paresthesias consist of numbness or tingling in the areas innervated by the ulnar nerve.

Proximal impingement is associated with mixed symptoms, as the proximal nerve consists of mixed sensory and motor innervation.
Distal impingement is associated with variable symptoms, as the ulnar nerve separates near the hand into distinct motor and sensory branches.

In cubital tunnel syndrome (a proximal impingement), sensory and motor symptoms tend to occur in a certain sequence. Initially, there may be numbness of the small and ulnar fourth finger which may be transient. If the impingement is not corrected, the numbness may become constant and progress to hand weakness. A characteristic resting hand position of "ulnar claw," where the small and ring fingers curl up, occurs late in the disease and is a sign of severe neuropathy.
By contrast, in Guyon's canal syndrome (distal impingement) motor symptoms and claw hand may be more pronounced, a phenomenon known as the ulnar paradox. Also, the back of the hand will have normal sensation.

Diagnosis
The distinct innervation of the hand usually enables diagnosis of an ulnar nerve impingement by symptoms alone.  Ulnar nerve damage that causes paralysis to these muscles will result in a characteristic ulnar claw position of the hand at rest. Clinical tests such as the card test for Froment's sign, can be easily performed for assessment of ulnar nerve. However, a complete diagnosis should identify the source of the impingement, and radiographic imaging may be necessary to determine or rule-out an underlying cause.

Imaging studies, such as ultrasound or MRI, may reveal anatomic abnormalities or masses responsible for the impingement.  Additionally, imaging may show secondary signs of nerve damage that further confirm the diagnosis of impingement. Signs of nerve damage include flattening of the nerve, swelling of the nerve proximal to site of injury, abnormal appearance of nerve, or characteristic changes to the muscles innervated by the nerve.

Differential diagnoses
Symptoms of ulnar neuropathy or neuritis do not necessarily indicate an actual physical impingement of the nerve; any injury to the ulnar nerve may result in identical symptoms.  In addition, other functional disturbances may result in irritation to the nerve and are not true "impingement". For example, anterior dislocation and "snapping" of ulnar nerve across the medial epicondyle of the elbow joint can result in ulnar neuropathy.

Entrapment of other major sensory nerves of the upper extremities result in deficits in other patterns of distribution.  Entrapment of the median nerve causes carpal tunnel syndrome, which is characterized by numbness in the thumb, index, middle, and half of the ring finger.  Compression of the radial nerve causes numbness of the back of the hand and thumb, and is much rarer.

A simple way of differentiating between significant median and ulnar nerve injury is by testing for weakness in flexing and extending certain fingers of the hand. Median nerve injuries are associated with difficulty flexing the index and middle finger when attempting to make a fist. However, with an ulnar nerve lesion, the pinky and ring finger cannot be unflexed when attempting to extend the fingers.

Some people are affected by multiple nerve compressions, which can complicate diagnosis.

Classification
Ulnar nerve entrapment is classified by location of entrapment.  The ulnar nerve passes through several small spaces as it courses through the medial side of the upper extremity, and at these points the nerve is vulnerable to compression or entrapment—a so-called "pinched nerve". The nerve is particularly vulnerable to injury when there has been a disruption in the normal anatomy. The most common site of ulnar nerve entrapment is at the elbow, followed by the wrist.

Causes or structures which have been reported to cause ulnar nerve entrapment include:
 Problems originating at the neck: thoracic outlet syndrome, cervical spine pathology, compression by anterior scalene muscles
 Problems originating in the chest: compression by pectoralis minor muscles
 Brachial plexus abnormalities
 Elbow: fractures, growth plate injuries, cubital tunnel syndrome, flexorpronator aponeurosis, arcade of Struthers
 Forearm: tight flexor carpi ulnaris muscles
 Wrist: fractures, ulnar tunnel syndrome, hypothenar hammer syndrome
 Artery aneurysms or thrombosis
 Other: Infections, tumors, diabetes, hypothyroidism, rheumatism, and alcoholism

Cubital tunnel syndrome
The most common location of ulnar nerve impingement at the elbow is within the cubital tunnel, and is known as cubital tunnel syndrome. The tunnel is formed by the medial epicondyle of the humerus, the olecranon process of the ulna and the tendinous arch joining the humeral and ulnar heads of the flexor carpi ulnaris muscle. While most cases of injury are minor and resolve spontaneously with time, chronic compression or repetitive trauma may cause more persistent problems.  Commonly cited scenarios include:
 Sleeping with the arm folded behind neck, elbows bent.
 Pressing the elbows upon the arms of a chair while typing.
 Resting or bracing the elbow on the arm rest of a vehicle.
 Bench pressing.
 Intense exercising and strain involving the elbow.

Compression of the ulnar nerve at the medial elbow may occasionally be caused by an epitrocheloanconeus muscle, an anatomical variant.

Ulnar tunnel syndrome

Ulnar nerve impingement along an anatomical space in the wrist called the ulnar canal is known as ulnar tunnel syndrome. Recognized causes of ulnar nerve impingement at this location include local trauma, fractures, ganglion cysts, and classically avid cyclists who experience repetitive trauma against bicycle handlebars. This form of ulnar neuropathy comprises two work-related syndromes: so-called "hypothenar hammer syndrome," seen in workers who repetitively use a hammer, and "occupational neuritis" due to hard, repetitive compression against a desk surface.

Prevention
Cubital tunnel syndrome may be prevented or reduced by maintaining good posture and proper use of the elbow and arms, such as wearing an arm splint while sleeping to maintain the arm is in a straight position instead of keeping the elbow tightly bent. A recent example of this is popularization of the concept of cell phone elbow and game hand.

Treatment
The most effective treatment for cubital tunnel syndrome is surgical decompression. The most safe and effective operation is in-situ decompression +/- medial epicondylectomy.

For pain symptoms, medications such as NSAID, amitriptyline, or vitamin B6 supplementation may help although there is no evidence to support this claim.

Mild symptoms may first be treated non-operatively, with the following:
 Elbow joint immobilization in extension at night +/- during the day
 Neural flossing/gliding exercises
 Strengthening/stretching exercises
 Activity modification (e.g. avoidance of pressure on the elbows)

It is important to identify positions and activities that aggravate symptoms and to find ways to avoid them. For example, if the person experiences symptoms when holding a telephone up to the head, then the use of a telephone headset will provide immediate symptomatic relief and reduce the likelihood of further damage and inflammation to the nerve.  For cubital tunnel syndrome, it is recommended to avoid repetitive elbow flexion and also avoiding prolonged elbow flexion during sleep, as this position puts stress of the ulnar nerve.

Cubital tunnel decompression surgery involves an incision posteromedial to the medial epicondyle which helps avoid the medial antebrachial cutaneous nerve branches. The ulnar nerve is identified and released from its fascia proximally and distally up to the flexor carpi ulnaris heads. After release, flexion and extension of the arm are performed to ensure there is no subluxation of the ulnar nerve.

Prognosis
Following surgery, on average, 85% of patients report an improvement in their symptoms

Most patients diagnosed with cubital tunnel syndrome have advanced disease (atrophy, static numbness, weakness) that might reflect permanent nerve damage that will not recover after surgery. When diagnosed prior to atrophy, weakness or static numbness, the disease can be arrested with treatment.  Mild and intermittent symptoms often resolve spontaneously.

Epidemiology
People with diabetes mellitus are at higher risk for any kind of peripheral neuropathy, including ulnar nerve entrapments.

Cubital tunnel syndrome is more common in people who spend long periods of time with their elbows bent, such as when holding a telephone to the head. Flexing the elbow while the arm is pressed against a hard surface, such as leaning against the edge of a table, is a significant risk factor. The use of vibrating tools at work or other causes of repetitive activities increase the risk, including throwing a baseball.

Damage to or deformity of the elbow joint increases the risk of cubital tunnel syndrome. Additionally, people who have other nerve entrapments elsewhere in the arm and shoulder are at higher risk for ulnar nerve entrapment. There is some evidence that soft tissue compression of the nerve pathway in the shoulder by a bra strap over many years can cause symptoms of ulnar neuropathy, especially in very large-breasted women.

See also
 Cervical Vertebrae
 Ulnar neuropathy

References

External links 

Musculoskeletal disorders
Overuse injuries
Mononeuropathies of upper limb
Syndromes